Haaksbergse Sport Club 1921, known as HSC '21 is a football club from Haaksbergen, Netherlands. The club, was founded in 1921, is currently playing in the Derde Divisie, the second highest tier of amateur football in the Netherlands.

Current squad 
As of 1 February 2016

External links
 Official site

HSC '21
Football clubs in the Netherlands
Association football clubs established in 1921
1921 establishments in the Netherlands
Football clubs in Overijssel
Sport in Haaksbergen